Anthology: The Best of Marvin Gaye is a double CD chronology of American singer Marvin Gaye's career throughout his twenty-year tenure with Motown Records from his first hit song, 1962's "Stubborn Kind of Fellow", to his final Motown R&B charter, "Heavy Love Affair" in 1981. The anthology also covered a set of duet recordings with Mary Wells, Kim Weston, Tammi Terrell, and Diana Ross, as well as unreleased recordings from the 1960s and 1970s.

Gaye's Anthology set was actually released a total of three times in different track listings. The 1974 original, which charted, featured singles spanning from his 1962's "Stubborn" to material from his What's Going On album, while a 1986 re-issue featured songs from Let's Get It On, I Want You and duets with Diana Ross.

The 1995 re-issue deleted some of the duets from the other two releases and included material from Gaye's later period (1978–1981). The set has since been out of stock for some time.

Track listing

References

1995 greatest hits albums
Albums produced by Hal Davis
Albums produced by Harvey Fuqua
Albums produced by Leon Ware
Albums produced by Marvin Gaye
Albums produced by Norman Whitfield
Albums produced by Smokey Robinson
Compilation albums published posthumously
Marvin Gaye compilation albums
Motown compilation albums